Age-Old Friends is a 1989 television drama film directed by Allan Kroeker and starring Hume Cronyn and Vincent Gardenia, who won Primetime Emmy Awards for their performances.  It was written by Bob Larbey, based on his play A Month of Sundays.

Premise
Two men at an affluent retirement home fight for their independence and dignity in old age.

Cast
 Hume Cronyn as John Cooper
 Vincent Gardenia as Michael Aylott
 Tandy Cronyn as Julia
 Barry Flatman as Peter
 Michele Scarabelli as Nurse Wilson
 Esther Rolle as Mrs. Baker
 Aaron Schwartz as Dr. Spears

Reception
The Los Angeles Times raved, "HBO tonight gives us the performance of the season in the story of the season. Hume Cronyn and Age-Old Friends are that outstanding."

Awards
Hume Cronyn won a Primetime Emmy Award for Outstanding Lead Actor in a Miniseries or Movie and Vincent Gardenia won Outstanding Supporting Actor in a Miniseries or Movie.

References

External links 
 

1989 television films
1989 films
1989 crime drama films
American films based on plays
Films scored by Stanley Myers
1980s English-language films